Asker and Bærum District Court is the district court serving Asker and Bærum in Norway. Cases may be appealed to Borgarting Court of Appeal. The court is located in Sandvika in Bærum. It has 13 professional judges, of which one is the chief judge, and 2 deputy judges. The administration has 20 employees. In 2006, the court handled 280 criminal cases, 70 civil cases plus summary procedures.

References
 Asker and Bærum District Court

Defunct district courts of Norway
Organisations based in Bærum